Charles de Beaumont (5 May 1902 – 7 July 1972) was a British fencer.

Fencing career
He competed at the 1936, 1948 and 1952 Summer Olympics.

He represented England and won two gold medals in the Épée individual and the Sabre team and a silver medal in the Épée individual at the 1950 British Empire Games in Auckland, New Zealand.

He represented England and won a gold medal in the Épée team at the 1954 British Empire and Commonwealth Games in Vancouver, Canada.

He was a four times British fencing champion, winning the épée title at the British Fencing Championships in 1936, 1937, 1938 and 1953.

References

1902 births
1972 deaths
British male fencers
Olympic fencers of Great Britain
Fencers at the 1936 Summer Olympics
Fencers at the 1948 Summer Olympics
Fencers at the 1952 Summer Olympics
Sportspeople from Liverpool
Fencers at the 1950 British Empire Games
Commonwealth Games medallists in fencing
Commonwealth Games gold medallists for England
Commonwealth Games silver medallists for England
Medallists at the 1950 British Empire Games
Medallists at the 1954 British Empire and Commonwealth Games